American singer Madonna has performed on eleven concert tours, nineteen one-off concerts, nine benefit concerts, and three music festivals. Madonna has been nicknamed by some publications as the "Queen of Concerts" or "Queen of Touring", recognizing her "years-deep involvement in the touring game" and stage shows. As of January 2023, Madonna remains the highest-grossing female touring artist according to Billboard Boxscore and Pollstar.

Her 1985 debut concert tour, The Virgin Tour, was held in North America only and went on to collect more than US $5 million. In 1987 she performed on the worldwide Who's That Girl World Tour, which visited Europe, North America and Japan, and earned $25 million. One of the tour's shows in Paris in front of 130,000 fans was the largest paying concert audience by a female artist at the time and remains the largest crowd of any concert in French history. In 1990, she embarked on the Blond Ambition World Tour, which was dubbed the "Greatest Concert of the 1990s" by Rolling Stone. BBC credited the tour with "invent[ing] the modern, multi-media pop spectacle". In 1993, Madonna visited Israel and Turkey for the first time, followed by Latin America and Australia, with The Girlie Show. A review in Time by Sam Buckley said: "Madonna, once the Harlow harlot and now a perky harlequin, is the greatest show-off on earth."

Madonna did not tour again until the Drowned World Tour in 2001. She played the guitar and her costumes included a punkish tartan kilt and a geisha kimono. Some critics complained that the show concentrated on material from her most recent albums, but generally, the response was favorable. She grossed more than US $75 million with summer sold-out shows and eventually played in front of 730,000 people throughout North America and Europe. The Drowned World Tour was followed by the 2004 Re-Invention World Tour. Madonna was inspired to create the tour after taking part in an art installation called X-STaTIC PRo=CeSS, directed by photographer Steven Klein. Billboard awarded Madonna the "Backstage Pass Award" in recognition of having the top-grossing tour of the year, with ticket sales of nearly US $125 million.

Madonna's next tours broke world records, with the 2006 Confessions Tour grossing over US $194.7 million, becoming the highest-grossing tour ever for a female artist at that time. This feat was surpassed in 2008 with the Sticky & Sweet Tour, which at the time, became the highest-grossing tour ever by a solo artist, and the second highest-grossing tour of all time, with approximately US $411 million in ticket sales. In 2012, The MDNA Tour was completed as the tenth highest-grossing tour of all time with US $305 million, the second highest among female artists at the time, only behind the Sticky & Sweet Tour. Her 2015–16 Rebel Heart Tour was an all-arena tour which grossed $169.8 million from 1.045 million attendance.

Madonna has embarked on several promotional concerts to promote her studio albums, as well as performing award shows and benefit concerts like Live Aid (1985), Live 8 (2005) and Live Earth (2007). In 2012, she headlined the Super Bowl XLVI halftime show, which at that time was the most-watched halftime show in history. According to Billboard Boxscore, Madonna grossed over $1.31 billion in concert ticket sales between 1990 and 2016; she first crossed a billion gross with The MDNA Tour. Overall, Madonna ranks third, with just The Rolling Stones ($1.84 billion) and U2 ($1.67 billion) ahead of her. With over 11.6 million tickets sold as of 2022, Madonna appeared as the female artist with the most tickets sold worldwide on a Pollstar list. During the London stop of her 2006 Confessions Tour, Madonna became the first performer to be inducted into the Wembley Arena Square of Fame.

Concert tours

One-off concerts

Benefit concerts

Music festivals

See also 
 List of performances on Top of the Pops

Notes

References

Citations

Book sources

External links
 Madonna.com > Tours > Archives

 
Madonna
Concerts